Courtney is an unincorporated community in Jackson County, in the U.S. state of Missouri.

History
A post office called Courtney was established in 1888, and remained in operation until 1962. The community has the name of C. C. Courtney, an early settler.

References

Unincorporated communities in Jackson County, Missouri
Unincorporated communities in Missouri